Wesam Wahib (born 1 April 1992) is a Saudi Arabian football player who currently plays as a winger for Al-Arabi.

External links
 

Living people
1992 births
Association football forwards
Saudi Arabian footballers
Hetten FC players
Al-Shabab FC (Riyadh) players
Najran SC players
Al-Qadsiah FC players
Al-Kawkab FC players
Al-Arabi SC (Saudi Arabia) players
Place of birth missing (living people)
Saudi First Division League players
Saudi Second Division players
Saudi Professional League players